Peter Varga (born 27 January 1998) is a Slovak professional footballer currently playing for FC Košice.

He made his career league debut for FK Senica on 22 September 2015 in a Slovak Super Liga 0–3 away loss at Zlaté Moravce at the age of 17 years, 7 months, and 26 days.

External links 

Peter Varga Futbalnet profile

Slovak footballers
1998 births
Living people
Slovak Super Liga players
FK Senica players
Gyirmót FC Győr players
Expatriate footballers in Hungary
MŠK Púchov players
KFC Komárno players
Association football midfielders